Ōkawara, Okawara or Ookawara (written: 大河原) is a Japanese surname. Notable people with the surname include:

, Japanese mechanical designer in the anime industry
, Japanese politician
, Japanese film director, writer and producer

See also
Ōkawara Station, a railway station in Minamiyamashiro, Soraku District, Kyoto Prefecture, Japan

Japanese-language surnames